The Redberry Lake Biosphere Region was established in 2000 as a UNESCO Biosphere Reserve covering  in the province of Saskatchewan, Canada. The regional landscape is composed of rolling prairie dotted with seasonal ponds and marshes along with aspen/shrub groves. The core area is Redberry Lake, a saline lake with several islands. There are small patches of natural mixed prairie which are very rare in this highly grazed and cultivated part of the prairies. The Redberry Lake Biosphere Region is committed to balancing conservation with sustainable development.

Redberry Lake is an Important Bird Area (IBA) of Canada designated as Redberry Lake (SK 005).

Ecological characteristics 
Redberry Lake is an endorheic lake in which water entering the lake does not pass out through downstream flows. The lake itself is a large kettle hole characterized by a central flat bottom. Water is shallowest in the south-west, south-east and north-east areas, and around the islands.

Major habitats and land cover types include: typical prairie grasses such as wheat grass, fescue, oat grass and sedges; forest dominated by aspen with shrubs such as rasp, silver willow and hawthorn; a saline lake with rocky islands; farmland cultivated with wheat and barley; and pasture land. The reserve provides habitats for nine endangered, threatened or rare bird species, as well as over 180 other species including the whooping crane (Grus Americana), burrowing owl (Athene Cunicularia), white-winged scoter (Melanitta fusca), California gull (Larus californicus), ring-billed gull (Larus delawarensis), and piping plovers (Charadrius melodus). A key research activity undertaken in the area is monitoring of American white pelican (Pelecanus erythrorhynchos) nesting sites.

Socio-economic characteristics 
The region is home to a group of diverse people and cultures including Indigenous Plains Cree, Ukrainian, Mennonite, Doukhobors and other European cultures. The main economic activities in the region are agriculture and livestock raising. Ecotourism development over the past decades has encouraged new ways of looking at local habitats and brought new hope to some community enterprises. The expansion of sustainable tourism activities in tandem with wildlife protection is supported by a vast majority of stakeholders, including representatives of the local communities. The protected status of the site prevents tourism from intruding into fragile areas and allows tourist numbers to be kept at sustainable levels.

New sustainable models of agriculture are being adopted including grazing management in prairies ecosystems and there exists strong potential for the development of new sustainable agriculture, livestock and silviculture products that could be marketed under the biosphere reserve ‘brand’. There is also potential for linkages with other biosphere reserves to market products from sustainable resource use, and to educate the general public about conservation practices.

The reserve is administered by the Redberry Regional Economic Development Authority Corporation; Rural Municipalities of Redberry, Douglas, Meeting Lake, and Great Bend; Lucky Man First Nations Reserve; and Hafford, Saskatchewan.

Area 

See also 
 Biosphere Reserves of Canada
 List of Migratory Bird Sanctuaries of Canada
 List of protected areas of Saskatchewan

References

Sources 

Protected areas established in 2000
2000 establishments in Saskatchewan
Important Bird Areas of Saskatchewan
Biosphere reserves of Canada